An overcoat is an article of clothing.

Overcoat or overcoats may also refer to:

Overcoats (album), an album by John Hiatt
Overcoats (duo), a musical duo
Overcoat Recordings, a record label
"The Overcoat", a short story by Nikolai Gogol

See also
 The Overcoat (disambiguation)